The 2017 season saw Júbilo Iwata compete in the J1 League, the top tier of Japanese football.

J1 League

League table

Match details

Appearances and goals

References

External links
 J.League official site

Júbilo Iwata
Júbilo Iwata seasons